Ferns St Aidan's is a Gaelic Athletic Association club based in Ferns, County Wexford, Ireland. The club was founded in 1886 and fields teams in hurling, Gaelic football and camogie.

Overview

Facilities
Ferns St Aidan's has three full-sized adult pitches (one of which is the exact dimensions of Croke Park, and is regularly used by county teams for training) as well as a smaller, underage, pitch. The club also have a hurling wall for practice sessions, a clubhouse with four dressing rooms and a meeting room, two tennis courts and a walkway around the grounds.

Teams
Ferns St Aidan's field various teams in hurling, Gaelic football, and camogie at all age groups from under-8 right up to adult level. It is estimated that there are in the region of 300 players involved in the club altogether.

Achievements

 Wexford Senior Hurling Championships: 1
 2022
 Wexford Intermediate Hurling Championships: 6
 1958, 1979, 1984, 1989, 1998, 2007 
 Wexford Junior Hurling Championships: 5
 1912, 1932, 1952, 1956, 1958
 Wexford Junior Football Championships: 2
 1952, 1993
 Wexford Under-21 Hurling Championships: 2
 2005, 2007
 Wexford Minor Football Championships: 1
 1958
 Wexford Minor Hurling Championships:''' 4
 1957, 1958, 1965, 2004

Noted players
 Ian Byrne
 Tommy Dwyer
 Paul Morris
 Éamonn Scallan
Gavin Bailey

References

External links
Ferns St Aidan's GAA Club

Gaelic games clubs in County Wexford
Hurling clubs in County Wexford
Gaelic football clubs in County Wexford